Kornica may refer to:

 Kornica, Bosnia and Herzegovina, a village near Šamac, Bosnia
 Kornica, Świętokrzyskie Voivodeship, a village in Poland
 Kórnica, Opole Voivodeship, a village in Poland